Bieler is a surname of German/Swiss origin, finding its roots in the Low German word "bil", meaning "axe", Germanic roots  

surname include:

Alexander Bieler (born 1992), now Alexander Mühling, German footballer
Alfred Bieler (1923–2013), Swiss ice hockey player
André Charles Biéler (1896–1989), Swiss-born Canadian painter and teacher
Bruno Bieler (1888–1966), German general who commanded the LII Corps during World War II
Christoph Bieler (born 1977), Austrian athlete competing in Nordic combined
Claudio Bieler (born 1984), Argentine-born Ecuadorian footballer
Dominik Bieler (born 2001), Swiss cyclist
Ernest Biéler (1863–1948), Swiss painter, draughtsman and printmaker
Etienne Bieler (1895–1929), Swiss-born Canadian physicist
Franco Bieler (born 1950), Italian alpine skier
Fritz Bieler (1895–1957), Mexican aviator
Gustave Bieler DSO MBE (1904–1944), Special Operations Executive agent during World War II
Helmut Bieler (born 1940), German composer and pianist
Henry G. Bieler (1893–1975), American physician, wrote the book Food is Your Best Medicine
Ida Bieler, American violinist and professor of Violin
Jason Bieler, American singer, guitarist and songwriter with hard rock band Saigon Kick
Klaus-Dieter Bieler (born 1949), German athlete
Larissa Bieler (born 1978), Swiss journalist
Pascal Bieler (born 1986), German footballer
Paula Bieler, (born 1988), former Swedish politician for the Sweden Democrats party
Rüdiger Bieler (born 1955), German-American biologist
Wanda Bieler (born 1959), Italian alpine skier

See also
Bieler Bros. Records, independent record label based out of Florida, USA
Bieler See, lake in the west of Switzerland
Bieler Tagblatt, Swiss German-language daily newspaper
Beeler
Belier
Biller
Bleiler